Larkman is an Anglo Saxon surname used in the UK, United States, Australia, New Zealand and Canada. Although  Larkman is a very uncommon name it is not historically rare in Norfolk, England and it is possible that all Larkmans originated from Norfolk. Research carried out by Frank Randall and Brian Larkman has revealed that only a handful of Larkmans can be found outside Norfolk and Suffolk before 1800.

History of the Name

Most early Norfolk Larkmans lived off the land as farm labourers, some died as paupers whilst a few prospered and became yeoman farmers who employed others as labourers.

Gradually Larkmans moved from the countryside to the towns, some to Norwich, the more adventurous to London. John Larkman moved to Hull some time after 1824. Many became craftsmen, some Freemen of Norwich and one a Freeman of the City of London. From about 1860 onwards Larkman families moved further a field to the growing industrial centres - Tyneside, Teesside, Birmingham, Manchester and the Midlands.

A Larkman sailed with Shackleton to the Antarctic. William Larkman, a gardener to Norwich gentry gave his name to a part of Norwich which now has a Larkman Lane, Larkman school and a Larkman Pub (now demolished).

A branch of English Larkmans descend from one Johann Lochmann z Gamsenfels, (aka Lachmann von Gamsenfels) who was born in Prague, Czechoslovakia.  He came to London around 1880 to escape the Franco-Prussian wars.  He settled and married an English girl.  His son, Hermann John Lachman von Gamsenfels, changed his name by deed poll, in or around 1900, to John Larkman.  Donald Ewart Larkman, who is listed below as having died in World War 2, in the Netherlands, on 17 November 1940, (he was listed as MIA on 16 November, actual death was 17) is descended from this branch of the Larkmans.

Name Meaning

The Oxford dictionary of surnames gives the definition below.

Servant of Lark. Where Lark is from a medieval given name, a byform of Lawrence, derived by back-formation from Larkin

With just two exceptions (see note below) all Larkman families in the world can trace their ancestry back to the county of Norfolk in eastern England. From the early 15th up to the 18th century, bar two sightings in London, no Larkman is listed outside Norfolk or neighbouring Suffolk. This, along with its rarity, suggests that Larkman is a locative surname i.e. it is derived from a placename.

British Surnames by C W Bardsley (published 1901) suggests that Larkman is derived from Lakenham a small village one mile south of Norwich (now a suburb of Norwich). This theory is supported that the earliest recorded Larkmans are to be found in this area and that the surname de Lakenham appears in deeds and apprentice records in the early 14th century. It does not appear in later records.

Larkmans Who Died In World War One

Larkmans Who Died In World War Two

References

Surnames